is a monthly manga magazine published in Japan by Shōnen Gahōsha, aimed primarily at male audiences, mostly older teens and young adults. It is the sister publication of Young King (which in turn was the sister publication of the now-discontinued Shōnen King). As of 2008, the circulation of Young King OURs was 68,000 copies.

Manga artists and series featured in Young King OURs
 Yuki Hijiri
 Locke the Superman (ongoing)
 Gaku Miyao
 Devil Hunter Yohko
 Kouta Hirano
 Hellsing
 Drifters (ongoing)
 Masakazu Ishiguro
 And Yet the Town Moves
 Akihiro Ito
 Geobreeders
 Ark Performance
 Arpeggio of Blue Steel (ongoing)
 Ruri Miyahara
 The Kawai Complex Guide to Manors and Hostel Behavior
 Gaku Miyao
 Kazan
 Yasuhiro Nightow
 Trigun Maximum (originally published in Shōnen Captain)
 Rikdo Koshi
 Excel Saga
 Hajime Yamamura
 Kamunagara
 Ten ni Hibiki
 Satoshi Mizukami
 Lucifer and the Biscuit Hammer
 Planet With
 Spirit Circle
 Masahiro Shibata
 Sarai
 Satoshi Shiki
 I – Daphne in the Brilliant Blue
 Hiroki Ukawa
 Shrine of the Morning Mist
 Ayakashi no Yoru Ie
 Shutaro Yamada
 Loan Wolf
 Daisuke Moriyama
 World Embryo
 Isutoshi
 Aiki

References

External links
Young King Ours official website
 

1993 establishments in Japan
Magazines established in 1993
Magazines published in Tokyo
Monthly manga magazines published in Japan
Seinen manga magazines
Shōnen Gahōsha